Hildreth-Lord-Hawley Farm, also known as Pittsford Farms, is a historic home and farm complex located at Pittsford in Monroe County, New York. The -story, five-by-three-bay farmhouse was constructed in about 1814 and remodeled in the 1860s in the Italianate style.  The property also includes a contributing dairy, creamery / ice house, tenant house, smoke house, blacksmith shop, and wagon shed.  Contributing objects include a stone retaining wall with cast-iron fence, stone fireplace, fountain, and cast iron statuary.

It was listed on the National Register of Historic Places in 1996.

Gallery

References

Houses on the National Register of Historic Places in New York (state)
Italianate architecture in New York (state)
Houses completed in 1814
Houses in Monroe County, New York
National Register of Historic Places in Monroe County, New York
Blacksmith shops